The 1980 Washington Star International was a men's tennis tournament and was played on outdoor Har-Tru clay courts. The event was part of the 1980 Grand Prix circuit. It was the 12th edition of the tournament and was held at Rock Creek Park in Washington, D.C. in the United States from July 21 through July 27, 1980. Sixth-seeded Brian Gottfried won the singles title and earned $24,500 first-prize money.

Finals

Singles
 Brian Gottfried defeated  José Luis Clerc 7–5, 4–6, 6–4
 It was Gottfried's 2nd singles title of the year and the 19th of his career.

Doubles
 Hans Gildemeister /  Andrés Gómez defeated  Gene Mayer /  Sandy Mayer 6–4, 7–5

References

External links
 ATP tournament profile
 ITF tournament edition details

Washington Open (tennis)
Washington Star International
Washington Star International
Washington Star International